Seth Baczynski (born October 26, 1981) is an American professional mixed martial arts (MMA) fighter currently competing in the Middleweight division. A professional since 2006, Baczynski has formerly competed for the UFC, and was a cast member of Spike TV's The Ultimate Fighter: Team Liddell vs. Team Ortiz and The Ultimate Fighter: Redemption. He has also fought for top promotions such as the International Fight League, Tachi Palace Fights, World Lethwei Championship, and the Legacy Fighting Alliance.

Background
Born in Honolulu, Hawaii and raised in Apache Junction, Arizona, Baczysnki played football and basketball growing up. Upon graduating from Apache Junction High School, Baczynski began to train in mixed martial arts.

Mixed martial arts career

Early career
Baczynski began fighting in 2006, making his debut at a Rage in the Cage event. Baczynski lost the fight to Shane Johnson via kneebar submission in round one. Baczynski bounced back from the loss and won three straight fights, all for Rage in the Cage.

International Fight League
He then signed a contract with the International Fight League. He debuted for the promotion against Brent Beauparlant, losing via decision. He was given a second chance, and fought Dan Molina. The fight ended with Baczynski, again, on the losing end. Baczynski was released from the IFL after the loss.

Post-IFL
Baczynski obtained a 7–1 record after being released from the IFL. He then fought up and comer Roger Bowling, losing by vicious KO only nine seconds into round one. Baczynski won a fight against Tom Nguyen at a Wild Bill's Fight Night event. He was then selected to be a part of The Ultimate Fighter.

The Ultimate Fighter
Baczynski was selected as one of the 28 competitors for the eleventh season of the Ultimate Fighter. To get onto the show and become one of the 14 fighters, Baczynski had to fight Court McGee. After three rounds, the judges awarded the win to McGee, sending Baczynski home.

After a fighter was injured and forced out of the competition, Baczynski was given the injured fighter's spot. In his first fight back he fought Team Liddell's last pick, Joseph Henle. Baczynski won the fight via three round unanimous decision and moved onto the quarter-final round.

In the quarter-final round, Baczynski faced rival team member and friend Brad Tavares. As the first round ended, Baczynski threw an illegal soccer kick to the head of Tavares. Baczynski immediately apologized, knowing he could have seriously hurt Tavares, who went to his corner and slumped. After discussing the matter with the doctors, Herb Dean stopped the fight and Tavares was declared the winner by disqualification, advancing him to the semi-finals.

In 2017, he returned to TUF 25, ultimately losing by unanimous decision to Gilbert Smith.

Ultimate Fighting Championship
Baczynski made his UFC debut in a rematch against Brad Tavares at The Ultimate Fighter: Team Liddell vs. Team Ortiz Finale. After three close rounds, Baczynski lost the fight via unanimous decision (29–28, 29–28, 29–28).

Due to his loss to Tavares, Baczynski was subsequently released from the UFC.

Post-UFC
Soon after being released from the UFC, Baczynski was reportedly signed by Strikeforce and was scheduled to make his promotional debut at ShoMMA 10: Riggs vs. Taylor against Erik Apple. However, Apple was forced to pull out of the fight and a replacement was not named.

He then fought UFC and WEC veteran, Tim McKenzie, at Tachi Palace Fights 7. The fight was ended after Baczynski escaped from a near fight ending armbar submission hold, which ended up breaking his arm, and knocked McKenzie out with elbows. McKenzie appealed the result to the CSAC.

On April 9, 2011, Baczynski became the Interim Ringside MMA Welterweight Champion when he TKO'd formerly undefeated prospect Alex Garcia at Ringside MMA 10.

Return to UFC
Baczynski returned to the UFC facing Clay Harvison on September 17, 2011 at UFC Fight Night 25, replacing an injured DaMarques Johnson. He won the fight via submission in the second round.

Baczynski again stepped-in on short notice to fight Matt Brown on November 19, 2011 at UFC 139. He won the fight via submission in the second round.

Baczynski fought Lance Benoist on June 8, 2012 at UFC on FX 3. Baczynski defeated Benoist via split decision.

Baczynski next faced Simeon Thoresen on September 22, 2012 at UFC 152. Baczynski was surprisingly being out struck by Thoresen throughout the fight until he landed a big punch that instantly knocked Thoresen out late in the first round.

Baczynski was expected to face Kyle Noke on December 15, 2012 at UFC on FX 6.  However, Noke pulled out of the bout citing a shoulder injury and was replaced by Mike Pierce. He lost the fight via unanimous decision.

Baczynski fought promotional newcomer Brian Melancon on July 6, 2013 at UFC 162. He lost the fight via knockout due to ground and pound punches at the end of the first round.

Baczynski faced Neil Magny on November 6, 2013 at UFC Fight Night 31. He won the back-and-forth fight via unanimous decision.

Baczynski faced Thiago Alves on April 10, 2014 at UFC on Fox 11. He lost the fight via unanimous decision.  Despite the loss, this fight earned Baczynski his first Fight of the Night bonus award.

Baczynski faced promotional newcomer Alan Jouban on August 16, 2014 at UFC Fight Night 47. He lost the back-and-forth fight via knockout in the first round. Despite the loss, Baczynski earned his second consecutive Fight of the Night bonus award.

Baczynski faced Leon Edwards on April 11, 2015 at UFC Fight Night 64. Baczynski lost the fight as he was quickly knocked out only 8 seconds into the first round, and was subsequently released from the promotion.

The Ultimate Fighter: Redemption
In February 2017, it was revealed that Baczynski would again compete on the UFC's reality show in the 25th season on The Ultimate Fighter: Redemption. Baczynski was the first pick overall for Team Garbrandt. He faced Gilbert Smith in the opening round and lost via unanimous decision.

Independent promotions
Baczynski has gone 3–2 since leaving the UFC.

World Lethwei Championship
On May 2, 2019, Baczynski signed a multi-fight deal with Myanmar-based Lethwei organization World Lethwei Championship. He made his promotional debut against Lethwei world champion Dave Leduc on August 2, 2019. Baczynski lost the fight via knockout in the second round.

Personal life
Baczynski is married and has five children. Aside from fighting, he has a job as a utilities worker. Baczynski's paternal great-grandfather was an immigrant from Poland.

Championships and achievements

Mixed martial arts
 Ultimate Fighting Championship
 Fight of the Night (Two times) vs. Thiago Alves, Alan Jouban 
 Ringside MMA
 Interim Ringside Welterweight Championship (One time)

Lethwei
 Lethwei World
 2019 Event of the Year 
 Spia Asia Awards
 2019 Best Sport Tourism Destination Campaign of the Year – Bronze 
 Asian Academy Awards
 2019 Best Sport Program – National Winner

Mixed martial arts record

|-
| Loss
| align=center|22–18
| Jesse Taylor
| Submission (rear-naked choke)
| NWFA 1: Retribution
| 
| align=center| 1
| align=center| 0:46
| Bentonville, Arkansas, United States
|
|-
| Loss
| align=center|22–17
| Gerald Harris
| Decision (unanimous)
| C3 Fights 48
| 
| align=center| 3
| align=center| 5:00
| Newkirk, Oklahoma, United States
|
|-
|Loss
| align=center| 22–16
| Daniel Madrid
| Submission (guillotine choke)
| LFA 59
| 
| align=center| 1
| align=center| 2:54
| Phoenix, Arizona, United States
|
|-
|Loss
| align=center| 22–15
| Teddy Ash
| TKO (punches)
| Unified MMA 34: Supremacy
| 
| align=center| 5
| align=center| 4:58
| Enoch, Alberta, Canada
|
|-
|Win
| align=center| 22–14
| Matt Lagler
| KO (punches)
| California Cage Wars 7: Outdoor Supershow
| 
| align=center| 1
| align=center| 2:05
| Campo, California, United States
|
|-
|Win
| align=center| 21–14
| Marvin Babe
| Submission
| C3 Fights 46: Clash at the Council
| 
| align=center| 1
| align=center| 1:29
| Newkirk, Oklahoma, United States
|
|-
|Win
| align=center| 20–14
| Jonathan Casimiro
| TKO (punches)
| WFF MX: World Fighting Federation Mexico
| 
| align=center| 2
| align=center| 4:15
| Puerto Penasco, Sonora, Mexico
|
|-
| Loss
| align=center| 19–14
| Jesse Taylor
| Decision (unanimous)
| TFE MMA: Vengeance
| 
| align=center| 3
| align=center| 5:00
| Anaheim, California, United States
|
|-
|Loss
|align=center|19–13
|Leon Edwards
|KO (punches)
|UFC Fight Night: Gonzaga vs. Cro Cop 2
|
|align=center|1
|align=center|0:08
|Kraków, Poland
|
|-
|Loss
|align=center|19–12
|Alan Jouban
|KO (punch)
|UFC Fight Night: Bader vs. St. Preux
|
|align=center|1
|align=center|4:33
|Bangor, Maine, United States
| 
|-
|Loss
|align=center|19–11
|Thiago Alves
|Decision (unanimous)
|UFC on Fox: Werdum vs. Browne
|
|align=center| 3
|align=center| 5:00
|Orlando, Florida, United States
| 
|-
| Win
|align=center| 19–10
| Neil Magny
| Decision (unanimous)
| UFC: Fight for the Troops 3
| 
|align=center| 3
|align=center| 5:00
|Fort Campbell, Kentucky, United States
|
|-
| Loss
|align=center| 18–10
| Brian Melancon
| KO (punches)
| UFC 162
| 
|align=center| 1
|align=center| 4:59
|Las Vegas, Nevada, United States
|
|-
| Loss
|align=center| 18–9
| Mike Pierce
| Decision (unanimous)
| UFC on FX: Sotiropoulos vs. Pearson
| 
|align=center| 3
|align=center| 5:00
|Gold Coast, Australia
|
|-
| Win
|align=center| 18–8
| Simeon Thoresen
| KO (punch)
| UFC 152
| 
|align=center| 1
|align=center| 4:10
|Toronto, Ontario, Canada
|
|-
| Win
|align=center| 17–8
| Lance Benoist
| Decision (split)
| UFC on FX: Johnson vs. McCall
| 
|align=center| 3
|align=center| 5:00
|Sunrise, Florida United States
|
|-
| Win
|align=center| 16–8
| Matt Brown
| Submission (guillotine choke)
| UFC 139
| 
|align=center| 2
|align=center| 0:42
|San Jose, California United States
|
|-
| Win
|align=center| 15–8
| Clay Harvison
| Submission (rear-naked choke)
| UFC Fight Night: Shields vs. Ellenberger
| 
|align=center| 2
|align=center| 1:12
|New Orleans, Louisiana United States
|
|-
| Win
|align=center| 14–8
| Alex Garcia
| KO (punches)
| Ringside 10: Cote vs. Starnes
| 
|align=center| 2
|align=center| 2:44
|Montreal, Quebec, Canada
| 
|-
| Win
|align=center| 13–8
| Tim McKenzie
| TKO (elbows and punches)
| Tachi Palace Fights 7
| 
|align=center| 1
|align=center| 2:15
|Lemoore, California, United States
|
|-
| Loss
|align=center| 12–8
| Brad Tavares
| Decision (unanimous)
| The Ultimate Fighter 11 Finale
| 
|align=center| 3
|align=center| 5:00
|Las Vegas, Nevada, United States
| 
|-
| Win
|align=center| 12–7
| Tom Nguyen
| Submission (guillotine choke)
| Wild Bill's Fight Night 23
| 
|align=center| 2
|align=center| 1:32
|Duluth, Georgia, United States
|
|-
| Loss
|align=center| 11–7
| Roger Bowling
| KO (punches)
| MMA Big Show: Retribution
| 
|align=center| 1
|align=center| 0:09
|Vevay, Indiana, United States
|
|-
| Win
|align=center| 11–6
| James Warfield
| KO (flying knee and punches)
| Evolution MMA
| 
|align=center| 1
|align=center| 1:21
|Phoenix, Arizona, United States
|
|-
| Win
|align=center| 10–6
| Oscar Montano
| Submission (triangle choke)
| Mexican Fighting Championship
| 
|align=center| 1
|align=center| 1:30
|Puerto Penasco, Mexico
|
|-
| Win
|align=center| 9–6
| Antonio Grant
| KO (punch)
| Silver Crown Fights
| 
|align=center| 1
|align=center| 0:11
|Fort Wayne, Indiana, United States
|
|-
| Loss
|align=center| 8–6
| Donnie Liles
| Submission (anaconda choke)
| Warriors Collide 4
| 
|align=center| 1
|align=center| 2:01
|Colorado, United States
|
|-
| Win
|align=center| 8–5
| Eddie Arizmendi
| Submission (triangle choke)
| Rage in the Cage 111
| 
|align=center| 2
|align=center| 2:03
|Arizona, United States
|
|-
| Win
|align=center| 7–5
| Jordan Pergola
| Submission (triangle choke)
| XFC 3: Rage in the Cage
| 
|align=center| 1
|align=center| N/A
|Tampa, Florida, United States
|
|-
| Win
|align=center| 6–5
| Kito Andrews
| Submission (triangle choke)
| Full Moon Fighting
| 
|align=center| 3
|align=center| 3:50
|Sonora, Mexico
|
|-
| Win
|align=center| 5–5
| Chris Kennedy
| TKO (punches)
| Tuff-N-Uff: Thompson vs. Troyer
| 
|align=center| 1
|align=center| 2:50
|Las Vegas, Nevada, United States
|
|-
| Loss
|align=center| 4–5
| Dan Molina
| Submission (heel hook)
| IFL: Las Vegas
| 
|align=center| 1
|align=center| 1:32
|Las Vegas, Nevada, United States
|
|-
| Loss
|align=center| 4–4
| Brent Beauparlant
| Decision (unanimous)
| IFL: Connecticut
| 
|align=center| 3
|align=center| 4:00
|Uncasville, Connecticut, United States
|
|-
| Win
|align=center| 4–3
| Seth Ballantine
| Submission (armbar)
| RITC 89: Triple Main Event
| 
|align=center| 2
|align=center| 1:18
|Scottsdale, Arizona, United States
|
|-
| Win
|align=center| 3–3
| Travos Degrout
| Submission (choke)
| RITC 84: Celebrity Theatre
| 
|align=center| 1
|align=center| N/A
|Phoenix, Arizona, United States
|
|-
| Win
|align=center| 2–3
| Johnathan Tsosie
| Submission (choke)
| RITC 80: Fight Night at The Fort
| 
|align=center| 1
|align=center| 1:32
|Fountain Hills, Arizona, United States
|
|-
| Loss
|align=center| 1–3
| Shane Johnson
| Submission (kneebar)
| RITC 79: The Rage Returns
| 
|align=center| 1
|align=center| 2:29
|Tucson, Arizona, United States
|
|-
| Loss
|align=center| 1–2
| Gabriel Flores
| Submission (choke)
| RITC 76: Hello Tucson
| 
|align=center| 3
|align=center| 1:56
|Tucson, Arizona, United States
|
|-
| Win
|align=center| 1–1
| Robert King
| TKO (retirement)
| RITC 75: Friday Night Fights
| 
|align=center| 1
|align=center| 0:35
|Glendale, Arizona, United States
|
|-
| Loss
|align=center| 0–1
| Ryan Potter
| Submission (choke)
| RITC 73: Arizona vs. Nevada
| 
|align=center| 1
|align=center| 1:18
|Glendale, Arizona, United States
|

Lethwei record

|-  style="background:#FFBBBB;"
| 2019-08-02|| Loss ||align=left| Dave Leduc || WLC 9: King of Nine Limbs || Mandalay, Myanmar || KO || 2 || 2:35
|-
! style=background:white colspan=9 |
|-
| colspan=9 | Legend:

Mixed martial arts exhibition record

| Loss
|align=center| 0–1
| Gilbert Smith
| Decision (unanimous)
| The Ultimate Fighter: Team Garbrandt vs Team Dillashaw
| 
|align=center| 2
|align=center| 5:00
|Las Vegas, Nevada, United States
|Eliminated from the TUF 25 tournament.
|-

See also
 List of current UFC fighters
 List of male mixed martial artists

References

External links
 
 
 Ultimate Fighter Profile
 

1981 births
Living people
People from Apache Junction, Arizona
Sportspeople from the Phoenix metropolitan area
American male mixed martial artists
Welterweight mixed martial artists
Middleweight mixed martial artists
Mixed martial artists utilizing Lethwei
Mixed martial artists utilizing Brazilian jiu-jitsu
Mixed martial artists from Arizona
Ultimate Fighting Championship male fighters
American practitioners of Brazilian jiu-jitsu
American Lethwei practitioners
American people of Polish descent